Metrosideros bartlettii, also known as Bartlett's rātā, Cape Reinga white rātā or in Māori as rātā moehau, is one of twelve Metrosideros species endemic to New Zealand and is notable for its extreme rarity and its white flowers, somewhat uncommon in that genus of red-flowered trees and plants. Its natural range is in the far north of the North Island at Te Paki, in three patches of dense native forest near Spirits Bay (34° S) that escaped destruction by fire, namely Radar Bush, Kohuronaki Bush, and Unuwhao Bush. Only 13 adult trees are known to exist in the wild (down from 34 in 1992) and most of these are either ill or dying. The lack of fossil evidence elsewhere suggests that the tree may always have been restricted to the North Cape area, which was an island until it was connected to the mainland by the sandspit that constitutes Ninety Mile Beach.

Description

Metrosideros bartlettii was discovered by John Bartlett, a schoolteacher from Auckland, in 1975. He found an unusual tree growing in Radar Bush, 9.5 km south-east of Cape Reinga. Almost ten years passed before the flowers were collected, making possible a scientific description of the tree. Bartlett's rātā grows to a height of up to thirty metres, usually beginning life as a hemi-epiphyte on taraire (Beilschmiedia tarairi), puriri (Vitex lucens), rewarewa (Knightia excelsa) or  tree ferns (Cyathea spp.). Occasionally, the tree is found growing on the ground on rock outcrops and rocky cliffs. The tree bears white flowers made up of a mass of stamens in November or December. Seed ripens in March or April. The trunk is up to 1.5 m in diameter. Bartlett's rātā resembles northern rātā (Metrosideros robusta) but can be distinguished by the small white flowers and by the leaves, which taper to a point at the tip, while those of northern rātā are notched at the tip. Also distinctive is the white or whitish-grey bark that peels easily into soft flakes, which it is thought may offer resistance to fire damage. This may have been a key factor in the tree's precarious survival in an area prone to forest fire.

Conservation
Although the plant is in cultivation, the majority of cultivated plants come from one tree. Only 13 adult Bartlett's rātā are known to exist in the wild, and most of these are growing on privately owned land. Many of the specimens are isolated from other trees with the result that there is minimal transfer of pollen and few seeds are set. Analyses of the DNA have shown that there is very little genetic variation. The species is also vulnerable to browsing animals, and at risk of destruction by fire or by changes in the land management practices of the landowners.

Iwi Ngāti Kurī and the Department of Conservation have been working to restore tree numbers, including 360 trees planted into Radar Bush and Kohuronaki Bush. Work is also going into planting at Unuwhao Bush (the tree's current stronghold), as well as establishing new sites in the Far North utilising seedlings from all three remaining pockets of established trees, to maximise the remaining genetic diversity.

Cultivation
Bartlett's rātā grows readily from fresh seed, and prefers sunny sites with fertile, well drained soil. It can also be propagated from hardwood cuttings, although these may be very slow to take root. Plants in cultivation in New Zealand are relatively hardy in a range of conditions, and have shown tolerance of mild frosts, which are unknown in the natural habitat.

See also
Metrosideros excelsa, Pōhutukawa
Metrosideros robusta, Northern rātā
Metrosideros umbellata, Southern rātā
Metrosideros parkinsonii, Parkinson's rātā

Notes

References
 
 
 Simpson, P., 2005. Pōhutukawa & Rātā: New Zealand's Iron-Hearted Trees. Wellington: Te Papa Press.

External links
 Project Crimson

bartlettii
Endemic flora of New Zealand
Trees of New Zealand
Garden plants of New Zealand
Ornamental trees
Endangered flora of New Zealand
Taxa named by John Dawson (botanist)